Charles Jeter, is an American politician and business executive. He is known for having founded Team Racing Auto Circuit (TRAC). He also is the President of Intermodal FCL, Inc. A Republican, he represented District 92 in the North Carolina House of Representatives from Jan. 2013 until his abrupt resignation on July 25, 2016.

Early life
Jeter was born in Columbia, SC on August 30, 1973. He was born with a cleft lip & palate which has led to 26 corrective surgeries in his life. The first was at six weeks old and the final corrective surgery was in 1996 at age 23.

His father, Charles R. Jeter, was appointed by President Ronald Reagan to be Regional Administrator of the United States Environmental Protection Agency in 1981.

Education
Jeter received a Bachelor of Arts in business economics from Wofford College in Spartanburg, SC in 1995.

Hanson Enterprises
Jeter is a close friend of syndicated radio personality Terry Hanson and former employee of Hanson's company Hanson Enterprises.

Career
Jeter has started seven companies. The first in 1998 was Team Racing Auto Circuit (TRAC), which was a combination of NASCAR with the spirit of team-based sports such as the NFL. During his time with TRAC, he served as the company's Executive Vice President and successfully negotiated an 11-year contract with ESPN and a contract with Speedway Motorsports to use all six of their race tracks. In 2004, after selling his interest in TRAC, he left to create a domestic and international trucking and logistics company called Intermodal FCL, Inc., where he has served as president since. The company is based in Cornelius, NC. In 2009, he created a new community newspaper named The Lake Norman Citizen. The Citizen operates in Huntersville, NC and serves the communities of Cornelius, Davidson, Huntersville and Mooresville, NC. His most recent venture has been Noob Incorporated, a communications firm offering marketing, public relations, and production services to traveling circuses and carnival workers.

Politics
Jeter formerly served three terms as a Huntersville Town Commissioner. He ran in 2010 as an at-large candidate for the Mecklenburg County Board of Commissioners. He then won his seat in the North Carolina General Assembly in 2012 and was re-elected in 2014.

In 2016, Jeter won the Republican primary for his House seat by only 35 votes out of 7,427 cast. He was going to face Democrat Chaz Beasley in the November 2016 general election, but then withdrew from the race when he resigned from his seat.

Family
He was married in 2000 to Jennifer Marie Cox. Together, they have three children: Caroline (born in 2001); Ellie (born in 2003) & Charlie (born in 2006).

References

Lanier, Josh. "Jeter vies for at-large county commissioner seat", Carolina Weekly, Huntersville, NC February 12, 2010.
Marusak, Joe. "Jeter announces bid for Mecklenburg commission", "The Charlotte Observer, Charlotte, NC February 8, 2010.
Wilner, Barry. "TRAC, a team-oriented stock car series, is set to start its engines next year, but it still needs owners, drivers, and venues. ", Auto Racing Digest'' October 1, 2003.
Jeter, Charles. "Personal." VoteJeter.com. 1 Feb 2010. Commissioner Charles Jeter. 19 Feb 2010. <https://web.archive.org/web/20091023064149/http://www.votejeter.com/personal.html%3E.
https://web.archive.org/web/20091111115745/http://www.epa.gov/history/admin/reg04/jeter.htm

External links

1973 births
Living people
Republican Party members of the North Carolina House of Representatives
Wofford College alumni
Politicians from Columbia, South Carolina
21st-century American politicians